Baby-Sitting Is a Dangerous Job is a children's suspense novel by American author Willo Davis Roberts. It was first published in 1985.

Plot summary 
Babysitter Darcy Ann Stevens gets a summer job babysitting three children from the rich Foster family. But the second day that Darcy babysits, they are kidnapped and driven to an old house. No one knows where they are, and the kidnappers are demanding ransom from the Foster parents to let them go. Darcy and the children have to outwit the kidnappers to escape.

References

1985 American novels
1985 children's books
American children's novels
Macmillan Publishers books
Novels about child abduction
Mark Twain Awards